Back in Love City is the fifth studio album by English indie rock band the Vaccines. It is the first Vaccines album to involve keyboardist Timothy Lanham and drummer Yoann Intonti from the start, with the pair having officially joined the band midway through the making of previous album Combat Sports.

The album was released on 10 September 2021 through AWAL via Sony Music. Five singles, "Headphones Baby", the title track, "Alone Star", "El Paso" and "Jump Off the Top" have been released ahead of the album.

Track listing

Charts

References 

2021 albums
The Vaccines albums
AWAL albums
Sony Music albums